Glannau Porthaethwy is a designated Site of Special Scientific Interest (SSSI) along the northern shore of the Menai Strait in North Wales. It is a linear designation that extends some  along the shore from Britannia Bridge in the west to Craig y Don in the east. It also includes the island shorelines of Ynys Gorad Goch, Ynys Welltog, Ynys Benlas, Ynys Tysilio, Half Tide Rock, Ynys Faelog, Ynys Tobig, Ynys Gaint, Ynys Castell and Ynys y Big.

It was designated in 2003, as it is the most extensive sheltered rock shore in the area between Bardsey Island and Great Orme’s Head and because it supports the greatest diversity of marine plant and animal communities.

References

Cwm Cadnant
Llanfairpwllgwyngyll
Menai Bridge
Menai Strait
Coast of Anglesey
Sites of Special Scientific Interest on Anglesey